Fort Providence Airport  is a registered aerodrome that is open to the public.

See also
Fort Providence Water Aerodrome

References

Registered aerodromes in the South Slave Region